Villarrica may refer to:

Places
Chile
Lake Villarrica
Villarrica, Chile
Villarrica (volcano)
Villarrica National Park

Colombia
Villarrica, Colombia, a municipality in the department of Tolima

Paraguay
Villarrica, Paraguay, a city in the department of Guairá

See also
Villa Rica (disambiguation)
Villaricca, an Italian commune in the province of Naples
Villarica (disambiguation)